trans-2-Methyl-2-butenal is an organic compound with the formula CH3CH=C(CH3)CHO. This colorless liquid is a building block in organic synthesis.  It is an α,β-unsaturated aldehyde related to the better-known crotonaldehyde.  The European rabbit, Oryctolagus cuniculus, uses 2-methyl-2-butenal as a pheromone. The rabbit pheromone, trans-2-methyl-2-butenal, was reported to be involved in the communication between species, defined under the class of "interomone."

References

Alkenals